is a Japanese manga essay series by Mayumi Kurata. Damens Walker was serialized in the weekly magazine Weekly Spa! from June 14, 2000 to April 2013. The series has inspired two live-action television drama adaptations and a mobile anime series.

Synopsis

Media

Manga

Damens Walker is written and illustrated by Mayumi Kurata. It was serialized in the weekly magazine Weekly Spa! beginning in June 14, 2000 to April 2013. The chapters were later released in twenty bound volumes by Fusosha under the Spa! Comics imprint.

Kurata stated that her reason for ending the manga was not because of problems in her marriage, but because she had "lost frustration towards good-for-nothing men" and that her older age has changed her perspective on relationships.

Television drama

2002 adaptation

Damens Walker was adapted into a live-action television drama starring Ai Ijima and Chiaki Hara, which was broadcast on NTV from March 1 to March 29, 2002.

2006 adaptation

A second live-action television drama starring Norika Fujiwara and Yu Yamada was broadcast on TV Asahi from October 12 to December 7, 2006. The theme song for the 2006 adaptation is "Yume no Uta" by Koda Kumi. "Trans-winter (Fuyu no Mukōgawa)" by Showta was featured as an insert song.

Stage play

A stage play adaptation ran in 2006. A second stage play adaptation ran from October 30 to November 1, 2020.

Anime

A 12-episode anime adaptation titled Damens Walker: The Anime was released beginning March 1, 2010, with each episode having a run time of 3 minutes. The series was streamed weekly on Sundays on BeeTV for Docomo mobile phones. The theme song is "D-Woman", which was written and produced by Daimaou Kosaka and performed by his friend Masako Ohara.

Film

A live-action film titled Damens Walker: The Movie Jealousy Edition was released direct-to-video on May 2, 2018. The theme song is "Baby Call My Name" by Emi Nitta. Also included in the DVD is a talk show with Nobu Morimoto.

Reception

In 2010, Damens Walker sold a cumulative total of 2 million physical copies.

References

Japanese television dramas based on manga
Josei manga